"Thank God for Girls" is a song by American rock band Weezer. The song was released on October 26, 2015. The release of the song was accompanied by a lyric video which prominently features the cannoli mentioned in the song's first verse.

Commercial reception
After two days of radio airplay, "Thank God for Girls" was ranked as the most-added song of the week on alternative radio stations in the United States. It impacted more than twice as many stations as the next most-added song, The 1975's "Love Me."

Music video
The official music video was released on November 16, 2015. Prior to this, a lyric video for the song was posted to Weezer's VEVO channel on October 25, 2015, a day prior to the song's official release. It was directed by Scantron Films, a production company whose credits also include the music video for Fall Out Boy's "Uma Thurman."

Charts

Weekly charts

Year-end charts

References

2015 singles
2015 songs
Rap rock songs
Songs written by Rivers Cuomo
Weezer songs